Joseph-Oscar Auger (1873–1942) was a Canadian politician, serving as Mayor of Quebec City from 1928 to 1930.

Auger won the 20 February 1928 city election over incumbent mayor Télesphore Simard by a 7046 to 4752 vote.

References

1873 births
1942 deaths
Mayors of Quebec City